Terechnoye is a rural locality (a selo) in Khasavyurtovsky District, Republic of Dagestan, Russia. The population was 1,619 as of 2010. There are 13 streets.

Geography 
Terechnoye is located 29 km northwest of Khasavyurt (the district's administrative centre) by road. Kemsiyurt is the nearest rural locality.

References 

Rural localities in Khasavyurtovsky District